In 1949, shortly before he died, the English author George Orwell prepared a list of notable writers and other people he considered to be unsuitable as possible writers for the anti-communist propaganda activities of the Information Research Department, a secret propaganda organisation of the British state under the Foreign Office. A copy of the list was published in The Guardian in 2003 and the original was released by the Foreign Office soon after.

Background 

The Information Research Department (IRD) was a secret propaganda wing of the UK Foreign Office, dedicated to disinformation warfare, anti-communism, and pro-colonial propaganda. The IRD was created in 1948 by Clement Attlee's Labour government, and became both the largest wing of the Foreign Office and the longest running covert government propaganda department in British history.

Celia Kirwan, a close friend of Orwell who had just started working as Robert Conquest's assistant at the IRD, visited Orwell at a sanatorium where he was being treated for tuberculosis in March 1949. Orwell wrote a list of names of people he considered sympathetic to Stalinism and therefore unsuitable as writers for the Department, and enclosed it in a letter to Kirwan. The list became public in 2003.

Having worked for Cyril Connolly's Horizon magazine, and briefly as an editorial assistant for Humphrey Slater's Polemic, Kirwan was Arthur Koestler's sister-in-law and one of the four women to whom Orwell proposed after the death of his wife Eileen O'Shaughnessy in 1945. Although Koestler had supported such a match, Kirwan turned him down.

Notebook 

Orwell based his list on a private notebook he had maintained since the mid-1940s of possible "cryptos", "F.T." (his abbreviation for fellow travellers), members of the Communist Party of Great Britain, agents and sentimental sympathisers. The notebook, now at the Orwell Archive at University College London, contains 135 names in all, including US writers and politicians. Ten names had been crossed out, either because the person had died or because Orwell had decided that they were neither crypto-communists nor fellow travellers. The people named were a mélange: "some famous, some obscure, some he knew personally and others he did not." Orwell commented in New Leader in 1947:
The important thing to do with these people – and it is extremely difficult, since one has only inferential evidence – is to sort them out and determine which of them is honest and which is not. There is, for instance, a whole group of M.P.s in the British Parliament (Pritt, Zilliacus, etc.) who are commonly nicknamed "the cryptos". They have undoubtedly done a great deal of mischief, especially in confusing public opinion about the nature of the puppet regimes in Eastern Europe; but one ought not hurriedly to assume that they all hold the same opinions. Probably some of them are actuated by nothing worse than stupidity.

The notebook contained columns with names, comments and various markings. Typical comments were: Stephen Spender – "Sentimental sympathiser... Tendency towards homosexuality"; Richard Crossman – "Too dishonest to be outright F. T."; Kingsley Martin –"Decayed liberal. Very dishonest"; and Paul Robeson – "very anti-white. [Henry] Wallace supporter". Journalist Geoffrey Wheatcroft considered Orwell's remarks "perceptive and sometimes even generous", going on to say that "DN Pritt is described as an 'almost certainly underground' Communist but also a "Good MP (i.e. locally). Very able and courageous'". Among the names, Orwell selected 38 which he forwarded to Kirwan.

Richard Rees discussed the names with Orwell, later commenting that it was "a sort of game we played – discussing who was a paid agent of what and estimating to what lengths of treachery our favourite bêtes noires would be prepared to go." Orwell asked Rees to fetch the notebook from Orwell's former residence on the Scottish island of Jura, Scotland in early 1949, thanking him in a letter of 17 April.

One of Orwell's biographers, Bernard Crick, thought there were 86 names in the list and that some of the names were written in the hand of Koestler, who also co-operated with the IRD in producing anti-Communist propaganda.

Orwell was an ex-colonial policeman in Burma and according to Timothy Garton Ash, he liked making lists: 'In a "London Letter" to Partisan Review in 1942 he wrote, "I think I could make out at least a preliminary list of the people who would go over to the Nazi side if the Germans occupied England."'

Reactions to the list 

The British press had known about the list for several years before it was officially made public in 2003. In 1996 The Independent discussed the list and who was named on it in an article headlined, "Orwell's little list leaves the left gasping for more". In 1998 The Daily Telegraph used the headline "Socialist Icon Who Became an Informer".

Michael Foot, the former leader of the Labour Party and a friend of Orwell in the 1930s and 1940s, was "amazed" by the revelation. Richard Gott, who in 1994 had resigned as literary editor of The Guardian after admitting that he had accepted travel expenses from the KGB in an unrelated case, referred to Orwell's list as only a "small surprise".

The journalist and activist Norman MacKenzie, who was on the list, noted "Tubercular people often could get very strange towards the end. I'm an Orwell man, I agreed with him on the Soviet Union, but he went partly ga-ga I think. He let his dislike of the New Statesman crowd, of what he saw as leftish, dilettante, sentimental socialists who covered up for the Popular Front in Spain [after it became communist-controlled] get the better of him."

Bernard Crick justified Orwell wanting to help the post-war Labour government. "He did it because he thought the Communist Party was a totalitarian menace," he said. "He wasn't denouncing these people as subversives. He was denouncing them as unsuitable for a counter-intelligence operation."

The journalist and writer Alexander Cockburn was strongly critical of Orwell's actions, referring to the notebook as "a snitch list". Cockburn attacked Orwell's description of Paul Robeson as "anti-white", pointing out Robeson had campaigned to help Welsh coal miners. Cockburn also said the list revealed Orwell as a bigot: "There seems to be general agreement by Orwell's fans, left and right, to skate gently over Orwell's suspicions of Jews, homosexuals and blacks".

Professor Peter Davison, editor of Orwell's Complete Works, said those who would be really disappointed would be those who claimed to have been on the list but were not.

The historian John Newsinger considered it "a terrible mistake on his part, deriving in equal measure from his hostility to Stalinism and his illusions in the Labour government. What it certainly does not amount to, however, is an abandonment of the socialist cause or transformation into a footsoldier in the Cold War. Indeed, Orwell made clear on a number of occasions his opposition to any British McCarthyism, to any bans and proscriptions on Communist Party members (they certainly did not reciprocate this) and any notion of a preventive war. If he had lived long enough to realise what the IRD was actually about there can be no doubt that he would have broken with it".

The journalist Neal Ascherson was critical of Orwell's decision to give the information to the IRD, claiming "there is a difference between being determined to expose the stupidity of Stalinism and the scale of the purges and throwing yourself into the business of denouncing people you know." The journalist and activist Paul Foot said the revelations would not detract from Orwell's reputation as a great writer, noting "I am a great admirer of Orwell, but we have to accept that he did take a McCarthyite position towards the end of his life."

Celia Kirwan (Celia Goodman) said in 2003 that he was quite right to do it as "the only thing that was going to happen to them was that they wouldn't be asked to write for the Information Research Department".

The list 

Sources vary as to the number of names on the list (figures range from 35 to 38). Names on the list include the following 39:

Writers and journalists 

 "Aldred", novelist and author of Of Many Men (first name unknown, possibly James Aldridge)
 John Anderson, journalist, Industrial correspondent for The Manchester Guardian
 John Beavan, editor
 Arthur Calder-Marshall, writer
 E. H. Carr, historian
 Isaac Deutscher, former Trotskyist writer, correspondent for The Economist and The Observer (1942–1947)
 Cedric Dover, journalist
 Walter Duranty, New York Times Moscow correspondent
 Douglas Goldring, novelist
 "Major Hooper" (Arthur Sanderson Hooper), writer on military history
 Alaric Jacob, Moscow Correspondent for the Daily Express during the Second World War
 Marjorie Kohn, journalist
 Stefan Litauer, journalist
 Norman Ian MacKenzie, assistant editor of the New Statesman 
 Kingsley Martin, editor of the New Statesman
 Hugh MacDiarmid, poet and Scottish nationalist
 Naomi Mitchison, novelist
 Nicholas Moore, poet
 Iris Morley, Moscow Correspondent for The Observer during the Second World War
 R. Neumann, novelist
 George Padmore, Trinidadian journalist and anti-imperialist campaigner
 Ralph Parker, journalist, News Chronicle
 J. B. Priestley, novelist and playwright
 Peter Smollett, Daily Express journalist later identified as a Soviet agent, Smolka, recruited by Kim Philby. Smollett had headed the Russian section in Britain's wartime information ministry (MOI) and had stopped publication of Orwell's Soviet allegory, Animal Farm.
 Margaret Stewart, Tribune industrial/labour correspondent
 Alexander Werth, journalist

Academics and scientists 

 Patrick Blackett, physicist
 Gordon Childe, archaeologist
 John Macmurray, philosopher
 Tibor Mende, Foreign Affairs analyst
 J. G. Crowther, The Guardian's first science correspondent

Actors 

 Charlie Chaplin
 Michael Redgrave

Labour MPs 

 Bessie Braddock
 Tom Driberg
 Michael Foot
 John Platts-Mills
 Stephen Swingler

Others 

 Joseph Macleod, writer and theatre director
 Peadar O'Donnell, Irish socialist
 Leonard Schiff, clergyman
 Edgar Young, military officer

Other names in the notebook 

Some of the people named in Orwell's list, but not appearing on the IRD's subsequent list, were:

 Alex Comfort, pacifist writer
 Nancy Cunard, heiress and left-wing activist
 Katharine Hepburn, actress
 Harold Laski, economist
 Cecil Day-Lewis, poet
 Alan Nunn May, scientist
 Seán O'Casey, playwright
 Paul Robeson, actor and singer
 George Bernard Shaw, playwright
 John Steinbeck, novelist
 Randall Swingler, poet
 A. J. P. Taylor, historian
 Orson Welles, film director
 Solly Zuckerman, scientist

See also 
"Christmas tree" files

References

External links 

 

Anti-communism
Cold War military history of the United Kingdom
Works by George Orwell
Blacklisting in the United Kingdom
Collection of The National Archives (United Kingdom)
1949 documents
Information Research Department